USS Neosho (AO-23) was a Cimarron-class fleet oiler serving with the United States Navy, the second ship to be named for the Neosho River in Kansas and Oklahoma.

After surviving the attack on Pearl Harbor, Neosho operated in the South Pacific. During the Battle of the Coral Sea she was attacked and set alight, but managed to keep afloat until rendezvousing with an American destroyer on 11 May 1942.  The destroyer rescued the crew and sank the vessel.

Construction and commissioning 
She was laid down under United States Maritime Commission contract by Federal Shipbuilding and Drydock Company, Kearny, New Jersey, 22 June 1938; launched on 29 April 1939; sponsored by Mrs. Emory S. Land, wife of Rear Admiral Emory S. Land (Ret.), Chairman of the Maritime Commission; and commissioned on 7 August 1939.

Conversion at Puget Sound Naval Shipyard was completed on 7 July 1941, Neosho immediately began the vital task of ferrying aviation fuel from west coast ports to Pearl Harbor. On such a mission she arrived in Pearl Harbor on 6 December, discharged a full cargo to Naval Air Station Ford Island, and prepared for the return passage.

Service history 
Next morning, the surprise attack on Pearl Harbor found Neosho alert to danger; her captain—Commander John S. Phillips—got her underway and maneuvered safely through the Japanese fire, concentrated on the battleships moored at Ford Island, to a safer area of the harbor. Her guns fired throughout the attack, splashing one enemy plane and driving off others. Three of her men were wounded by a strafing attacker.

For the next five months, Neosho sailed with the aircraft carriers or independently, since escort ships—now few and far between—could not always be spared to guard even so precious a ship and cargo. Late in April, as the Japanese threatened a southward move against Australia and New Zealand by attempting to advance their bases in the Southwest Pacific, Neosho joined Task Force 17 (TF 17). At all costs, the sea lanes to the dominions had to be kept open, and they had to be protected against attack and possible invasion.

As the American and Japanese fleets sought each other out in the opening maneuvers of the climactic Battle of the Coral Sea on 6 May 1942, Neosho refueled the carrier  and the heavy cruiser , then retired from the carrier force with a lone escort, the destroyer .

The next day at 1000, Japanese search planes spotted the two ships and misidentified them as a carrier and her escort. 78 aircraft from Shōkaku and Zuikaku soon arrived and began searching in vain for the "carrier" force. Eventually, they gave up and returned to sink Sims and leave Neosho—victim of seven direct hits and a suicide dive by one of the bombers—ablaze aft and in danger of breaking in two. She had shot down at least three of the attackers. One of her crewmen, Oscar V. Peterson, was posthumously awarded the Medal of Honor for his efforts to save the ship in spite of his severe injuries suffered in the attack.

Sound seamanship and skilled damage control work kept Neosho afloat for the next four days. The stricken ship was first located by a RAAF aircraft, then an American PBY Catalina flying boat. At 13:00 on 11 May, the destroyer  arrived, rescued the 123 survivors and sank by gunfire the ship they had kept afloat. With Henley came word that the American fleet had succeeded in turning the Japanese back.

Awards 
Neosho received two battle stars for her service.

References

Further reading 
 (Primary source)

External links 

Naval Historical center: USS Neosho
navsource.org: USS Neosho
hazegray.org: USS Neosho
Web Archive.org of Naval Historical Center, USS Neosho (AO-23), 1939–1942 images
The U.S. Neosho (AO-23) Details the survivors' ordeal.
Roll of Honor

Cimarron-class oilers (1939)
Ships built in Kearny, New Jersey
1939 ships
World War II auxiliary ships of the United States
World War II tankers of the United States
Ships present during the attack on Pearl Harbor
World War II shipwrecks in the Coral Sea
Maritime incidents in May 1942
Ships sunk by Japanese aircraft